Echinodiscus bisperforatus is a species of sand dollar described by Nathanael Gottfried Leske in 1778. The species is found throughout the Indo-Pacific in the Red Sea and off the coasts of south and east South Africa, Thailand, Malayan Archipelago, and New Caledonia at depths up to 20 meters. It grows to lengths of 11.8 centimeters.

References

Animals described in 1778
Astriclypeidae
Taxa named by Nathanael Gottfried Leske
Fauna of the Indian Ocean
Fauna of the Red Sea
Fauna of the Pacific Ocean